Fred Tomaselli (born in Santa Monica, California, in 1956) is an American artist.  He is best known for his highly detailed paintings on wood panels, combining an array of unorthodox materials suspended in a thick layer of clear, epoxy resin.

The Art of Tomaselli

Tomaselli's paintings include medicinal herbs, prescription pills and hallucinogenic plants alongside images cut from books and magazines: flowers, birds, butterflies, arms, legs and noses, which are combined into patterns that spread over the surface of the painting like a virus or growth. He uses an explosion of color and combines it with a basis in art history. His style usually involves collage, painting, and/or glazing. He seals the collages in resin after gluing them down and going over them with different varnishes.

Tomaselli sees his paintings and their compendium of data as windows into a surreal, hallucinatory universe. “It is my ultimate aim”, he says, “to seduce and transport the viewer in to space of these pictures while simultaneously revealing the mechanics of that seduction.” Tomaselli has also incorporated allegorical figures into his work – in Untitled (Expulsion) (2000), for example, he borrows the Adam and Eve figures from Masaccio's Expulsion from the Garden of Eden (1426–27), and in Field Guides (2003) he creates his own version of the grim reaper. His figures are described anatomically so that their organs and veins are exposed in the manner of a scientific drawing. He writes that his “inquiry into utopia/dystopia – framed by artifice but motivated by the desire for the real – has turned out to be the primary subject of my work”.

Album covers

Tomaselli's artwork has been on the front cover of several albums. He designed the front cover artwork for Laura Cantrell's third album 'Humming by the Flowered Vine' on Matador Records. His painting, 'Gravity In Four Directions', was also used as partial cover artwork for The Magnetic Fields' album "i". He also has artwork featured in The Wilco Book, a book made by the band Wilco. His artwork is portrayed on Phish's eleventh studio album, "Joy", which was released September 8, 2009. His art also appears on the CD by Elysian Fields "Dreams That Breathe Your Name" released in July 2004.

Selected solo exhibitions
Joslyn Art Museum, Omaha, Nebraska (2019)
 Orange County Museum of Art, Newport Beach, California (2015)
University of Michigan Museum of Art, Ann Arbor, Michigan (2014)
 James Cohan Gallery, New York (2014)
Brooklyn Museum, New York (2010)
 White Cube, London (2009)
The Rose Art Museum, Massachusetts (2005)
IMMA, Dublin (2005)
Fruitmarket Gallery, Edinburgh (2004)
 Albright-Knox Gallery of Art, Buffalo, New York (2003)
 James Cohan Gallery, New York (2003)
 White Cube, London (2001)
SITE Santa Fe, New Mexico (2001)
 Palm Beach Institute of Contemporary Art, Florida (2001)
Whitney Museum of American Art, New York, (1999)

References 

  "Fred Tomaselli" by Ian Berry & Heidi Zuckerman Jacobson, 2009, Aspen Art Museum · DelMonico Books · Prestel, New York;

External links
Fred Tomaselli at James Cohan Gallery, New York
Fred Tomaselli at White Cube gallery, London
Fred Tomaselli behind the scenes story at Salon.com
Fred Tomaselli's page at Artnet.com
Fred Tomaselli on Artabase
Video interview with Fred Tomaselli

1956 births
Living people
20th-century American painters
American male painters
21st-century American painters
21st-century American male artists
Postmodern artists
Album-cover and concert-poster artists
American people of Italian descent
20th-century American male artists